This is a list of official U.S. state ships as designated by each state's legislature.

Table

See also
List of U.S. state, district, and territorial insignia

References

External links

State
Ships